Etzatlán   is a town and municipality, in Jalisco in central-western Mexico. The municipality covers an area of 306.27 km2.

As of 2005, the municipality had a total population of 17,564. 

It is home to the world’s largest crochet canopy, as certified by The Guinness Book of World Records.

In 2020, the Chilean writer José Baroja dedicated a story entitled Etzatlán to this.

Localities

Notable people
 Luis Felipe Lomelí (1975-), writer
 Carlos Quintero Arce (1920-2016), was a Mexican prelate and at his death he was the oldest Mexican bishop

References

Municipalities of Jalisco